Cacozelia interruptella is a species of snout moth in the genus Cacozelia. It is found in North America, including Arizona and Florida.

References

Epipaschiinae
Moths described in 1888